The Kopter AW09 (formerly the Marenco Swisshelicopter SKYe SH09 and Kopter SH09) is the Leonardo Helicopter Division's five-to-eight seat, single-engine multirole helicopter which is currently under development at Kopter’s facilities. It is a clean-sheet design amongst a market sector dominated by decades-old airframe designs. 

The first prototype P1 first flew on 2 October 2014. P2 in February 2016, P3 during November 2018. There have been ongoing delays in first flight of prototypes and TC/commercial deliveries deadlines.

On 8 April 2020, Italian manufacturer Leonardo announced the closing of the acquisition of Kopter Group AG (Kopter) from Lynwood (Schweiz). The purchase price consists of $185 million, plus earn out. At the time Kopter employed 320 people.

On 21 April 2021 Leonardo rebranded the SH09 single-engine helicopter as the AW09.

Development

History
In 2002, Martin Stucki, a mechanical engineer and commercial helicopter pilot, initiated design work on a design that led to the SH09. Frustrated by legacy designs and typically unsuited cockpits, Stucki had observed that the light single-engine helicopter market had not seen any all-new designs in decades, and he conducted market research that indicated a viable demand for a new rotorcraft in the 2.5-tonne class. In 2007 he formed Marenco Swisshelicopter (Marenco - from Martin Engineering and Consulting) to develop the rotorcraft.

The SH09 adopted several modern features. Its airframe is entirely composed of carbon composite materials; it employs a shrouded fenestron tail rotor and a high-visibility cockpit. The carbon composite construction allowed a relatively low empty weight. According to Mathias Senes, Marenco's chief commercial officer: "There’s no other material today that brings the benefits of rigidity, strength, and light weight". Stucki approached his design from a pilot's perspective, attempting to improve ergonomics, comfort, and operator requirements. It possesses excellent hot and high performance, lengthy flight endurance, a low noise signature, and has relatively smooth handling.

By 2009, sufficient financing had been secured from investors, which allowed for the SH09 to be formally launched that year; accordingly, the helicopter was given the designation SKYe SH09 in reference to the year that development on the project officially commenced. A small number of staff worked on the project, initially being a team of nine; an emphasis was made on recruiting very high quality engineers, including from other rotorcraft manufacturers such as Airbus Helicopters; the company had over 100 employees in 2016. Company operations in Switzerland have been split between the towns of Pfäffikon, where design work is centered, and Mollis, where assembly and flight testing operations are conducted; a third facility in Germany handles compliance verification.

A pre-production prototype of the SH09 was displayed at Heli-Expo 2011 in Orlando, Florida, marking its public introduction. At that time, Marenco stated that it planned to make first deliveries in 2015, and that it would produce as many as 15 SH09s within the first year as well as potentially rising to 30 rotorcraft in the following year. It was also stated that, while the Honeywell HTS900 turboshaft engine had been selected as the initial powerplant for the SH09, it was hoped that customers would soon be offered a choice in engines.

In May 2016 a company representative indicated that Marenco was pursuing the development of a twin-engine version of the design. In late 2016, Stucki stated that some flexibility to allow for the future adaption of the SH09 to become a twin-engine helicopter had already been incorporated into the base design, and indicated that a twin-engine variant was a straightforward progression.

In January 2018 the company was rebranded as Kopter, with the helicopter name changed to SH09 (dropping the SKY-e).

In February 2018, Kopter was seeking to raise CHF 150 million to carry it through certification to production in the second half of 2019, adding to the CHF 270 million already spent since 2007 by the Russian Mamut foundation.

Prototypes
The flight test program will use three prototypes (P1, P2 & P3) and two Pre-Series Aircraft 4 and 5 (PS4 & PS5). PS4 & PS5 will jointly serve for the certification flights. P1 was used to complete the first phase of the flight test program, proving the handling and attitude of the aircraft, and expanding the flight envelope, including autorotation tests and being flown to 97 per cent of its maximum internal load takeoff weight. P2 and P3 are the main vehicles for airworthiness certification testing; they are more representative of production aircraft, their design incorporating several refinements. The company plans to first certify SH09 with EASA, then rapidly seek certification in the United States.

P1 
In March 2011, Marenco planned P1's first flight for early 2012, During December 2013, the completed P1 was revealed to the public. but it actually first flew on 2 October 2014. The first flight lasted 20 minutes and was flown by chief test pilot Dwayne Williams. At that time the company projected receiving EASA certification within 12-16 months. In summer 2015, Marenco halted flight tests after 100 flight hours to focus on producing the second prototype, which incorporated a modified bearingless rotor head and new rotor blades to reduce vibrations. By September 2015, it was recognised that the original development timeline had been optimistic. The completion of P1 was reportedly delayed by as much as six months due to the late delivery of its engine by Honeywell.

P2 
On 26 February 2016, P2 performed its first flight, piloted by new chief test pilot Richard Trueman. At this point, certification was expected to be achieved near to the end of 2016 or during early 2017.

P3 
In May 2016, it was reported that Marenco were increasing the pace of the flight test program, that P3 was to be completed within that year, and that type certification should occur during 2017. Marenco had 70 Letters of intent in autumn 2015 and 90 in spring 2016, half from North America. In September 2015 the company stated its expectation to produce 40-100 aircraft per year.

In October 2016, Stucki stated that P3 would be completed in early 2017, and that certification would likely occur within 2018. Development was delayed by having to design and manufacture not only the helicopter itself, but also supporting tools such as test equipment. P3's first flight finally occurred in November 2018.

PS4 & PS5 
In January 2019 Kopter stated that PS4's first flight would be in 2019, but in March 2021, Kopter stated that first flight of PS4 would be in third quarter of 2021 and PS5 some months later.  In January 2023, Kopter stated that the first flight of PS4 would be in the first quarter of 2023 and PS5 to follow later in 2023.

Type certification & commercial deliveries 
In March 2011, Marenco planned its first deliveries in 2015. In May 2016, it was reported that Marenco that type certification should occur during 2017. In October 2016, Stucki stated that certification would likely to occur within 2018. In January 2018 the company stated its hope that the rotorcraft would enter service in 2019. During the 2018 Heli-Expo, Kopter announced 23 firm orders and 11 options worth $119 million from Norwegian Helitrans (12+6), Elling Halvorson for Rainier Heli Lift, Hawaiian Paradise Helicopters and South African Safomar Aviation.

Design
The SH09 is a light-medium helicopter, initially intended to be powered by a single Honeywell HTS900 turboshaft engine. It uses a shrouded fenestron tail rotor and the main rotor features a five-bladed bearingless hub; the shrouded tail rotor has a wider diameter and a thinner chord in order to increase airflow, while design aspects such as a narrow tail boom, swept-back tips on the main rotor blades, and the shrouded tail rotor offer reduced noise. The HTS900 is rated at 1,020-shaft-horsepower, and was intended to provide improved performance in hot and high conditions.

The monocoque fuselage is made from composite materials and is equipped with sliding side doors on either side along with a rear clamshell door; it incorporates a series of floor-mounted windows between the pilots' seats for additional vertical visibility. Some of the composite materials used have been produced using out of autoclave composite manufacturing from suppliers such as TenCate and Gurit. According to Marenco, inspiration for the fuselage's design was drawn from the automotive industry. It has been stated that the firm has sought to introduce the cabin volume of medium-sized twin-engine helicopters to the single-engine market.

The SH09 is offered with various different layout configurations. The standard option provides two pilot seats forward and four passenger seats aft, all adjustable fore/aft and up/down. In a high density configuration, five seats are installed in the rear position along with two more passenger seats inline with the pilot's own, which loses the option of the floor window. The use of Kevlar-threaded crashworthy fuel tanks, which are built into the wall and floor of the cargo hold, freed up space to allow for fully adjustable passenger seats in the cabin. The cargo hold is sized to accommodate 10 items of baggage, while the fuel tanks are sized to provide for an endurance of nearly five hours. The rear clamshell door and high-mounted tail boom were designed for air ambulance applications.

The SKH09 cockpit layout provides a generous field of view. A Sagem-built ICDS-8A glass cockpit suite is an integrated part of the SH09's standard avionics and instrumentation package. The rotorcraft has been designed with a condition-based maintenance policy, specifying that there should be no time between overhaul (TBO) limits on its various components and systems, including the engine; instead, maintenance is performed based upon condition, which is continuously monitored at all times by an onboard health and usage monitoring system (HUMS). Ease of maintenance and access to systems was an active consideration during the design phase, aiming to deliver lower overall maintenance costs.

In January 2023 the company announced that the helicopter would be powered by the Safran Arriel 2K engine in place of the originally planned Honeywell powerplant.

Operational history
It was announced at Heli-Expo 2016 that Swiss operator Air Zermatt would serve as the SH09's launch customer.

Specifications (SH09)

See also

References

External links

 Kopter AW09 home page
 Leonardo AW09 home page
 

2010s Swiss civil utility aircraft
2010s Swiss helicopters
Fantail helicopters
Single-turbine helicopters
Aircraft first flown in 2014